Amador High School, located in Sutter Creek, California, is one of two public high schools in Amador County. Originally known as "Amador County High School" at its inception in 1911, the school's name changed to "Sutter Creek Union High School" in 1916, reverting to "Amador County High School" in 1949, at the request of that year's graduating class. In 1984, upon completion of the merger of three school districts in the county, the name was changed to "Amador High School".

As of the 2020–21 school year, the school had an enrollment of 638 students and 31.6 classroom teachers (on an FTE basis), for a student–teacher ratio of 20.2:1. There were 177 students (27.7% of enrollment) eligible for free lunch and 14 (2.2% of students) eligible for reduced-cost lunch.

Academics
California uses the Academic Performance Index (API) to measure annual school performance and year-to-year improvement. Amador High School had an API growth score of 791 in 2009. Amador High School's 2009 base score was 788, however the school did not meet its 2009 school-wide growth target.

Under No Child Left Behind, a school makes Adequate Yearly Progress (AYP) if it achieves the minimum levels of improvement determined by the state of California in terms of student performance and other accountability measures. Amador High School made AYP in 2009.

School statistics
Scores on the California Standards Test follow:

Athletics
Amador High School is home of the Buffaloes (Thundering Herd). They are part of the Mother Lode League and a member of the California Interscholastic Federation (Sac-Joaquin Section) and offer the following programs:
 Fall Season: Football (Men), Cross Country Running, Volleyball (Women), and Water Polo.
 Winter Season: Basketball, Wrestling, Skiing/Snowboarding, and Soccer.
Spring Season: Baseball (Men), Softball (Women), Track & Field, Golf, Swimming, and Tennis.

Amador High School is well known for their Girls Soccer program. Since its inception in 1998, the Amador Girls Soccer program has amassed 13 league championships. The Amador Girls Soccer program won four consecutive year league championships, in both Varsity and Junior Varsity squads, (2012-2015) and has 2 CIF Section Championships in both division 6 in 2013 and division 5 in 2015. Amador also offers many other sports, such as football, baseball, basketball, wrestling, and swimming. Throughout the 1980s they had the most successful track and field program in the Mother Lode League with at times over 70 athletes participating on one team. The schools pee-wee football & cheer team is called the "Amador Jr. Buffaloes". Current UC Davis Football Defensive Assistant Brian Bellotti was a member of the Amador High School Football Team from 2001 to 2003. In 2011, the boys basketball team made it to the Sac-Joaquin Section Championships, held at Arco Arena. The team did not win, but became the runner-up. Amador's cross country has had some notable performances and consistently advances each year to sections led by Jesse Shaw. Amador's Girl Cross Country won the Sac-Joaquin Sections in 2012-2013, and continued on to State. The boys' cross country team ran very well in their 2017 season and became undefeated MLL Champions and placed 3rd at Sac-Joaquin Sections. Amador's football program led by Bill Baker. He has produced multiple winning seasons as well as playoff appearances in the past few years. After losing in the 1st round 3 years in a row, some of the Amador players have decided to change up the tradition of 'facing the house' and now face the hill in all warm ups. In 2016, Coach Bill Baker lead the Thundering Herd to win the CIF Division 6 Sectional Championship.

In September 2022, shortly after the beginning of a game, the Amador County Unified School District cancelled all of the school's scheduled varsity football games, including the one then in progress, due to the discovery of a group chat with "racial overtones" involving a majority of the team, ending the team's entire 2022-2023 season with the cancelled games scored as forfeit. The matter was turned over to an independent investigator, with some allegations referred to law enforcement.

Rivalry with Argonaut
Known as the "Big Game" officially, and unofficially also the "Cross-County Clash", the towns of Sutter Creek and Jackson have watched Argonaut High School & Amador High School face off in athletics for more than 50 years. In football, both teams play for the coveted "Rotary Bell", which remains in the possession of the winning team for a full year. Students previously participated by defacing the other school's property, but in recent years police have succeeded in controlling the vandalism. The town of Sutter Creek supports Amador during sports seasons by displaying the school's colors along Main Street.

Theater
Amador High School Drama and Publications is headed by theater teacher Giles Turner (who has held the position since 1967). The curriculum within the program focuses on a wide range: improvisation, solo acting, duo acting, musical theater, playwriting, and both modern and classical plays are chosen for productions. In the year end show, Revue, students are encouraged to write original skits and perform original music. Community involvement is a cornerstone of Turner's program, with students often asked to volunteer at events in the county throughout the year.

Students of the program typically compete in two separate theater festivals: Lenaea Drama festival in Folsom and Amador's own Motherlode Drama Festival (MLDF). Typically held in the last week of April, the Mother Lode Drama Festival invites schools from across Central and Northern California to compete in solo acting, duo acting, one-act plays and vocal competitions. A larger focus of either festival is on community building for the students, rather than outright competition/awards.

In 2013, the school's theater was retitled The Giles Turner Performing Arts Center, in honor of Turner's 50th year in the teaching profession. Later in 2018, Turner was again commemorated with a celebration held by former students in honor of his 50th year teaching theater at Amador; in order to continue his legacy, a theater scholarship, the Giles Turner Alumni fund, was set up to provide financial aid to those who wish to continue to study theater.

Band
Amador High School started the first band in all of Amador County in Sutter Creek in the 1914–15 school year, with the 2014–15 school year marking the 100th anniversary of bands in the county. The band has had a number of directors, most notably Hank King, who was the director at the school on and off for over forty years. Evan Fellman is the current band director for the high school.

In 2005, Christopher Tootle became the main director for the ailing school band program, and has since built it back up to over fifty students. Tootle had recently announced his resignation for the 2014–2015 school year, although UOP-graduate John Johnson took his place as of September 16, 2014.  Johnson himself had graduated from Amador High School in 2010.

The concert band participates in the Disneyland Performing Arts program, going every two years. Other band events include: The Italian Picnic Parade, the Parade of Lights, Forum Festival, PacWest, and many more. The standard uniform for marching is white tops with silver buttons, navy pants, black shoes and black shakos. Concert attire is black blouses and skirts for the ladies and tuxedos for the gentlemen.

Notable alumni
 Tory Bruno Class of 1979 - Aerospace Executive and Rocket Scientist. CEO of United Launch Alliance
 Enver Gjokaj: Actor
 John Vukovich: Major League Baseball player, manager, coach

References

External links
 Amador High School
 Amador High School student and parent site
 Amador Jr. Buffalos Football & Cheer
 Amador High School sports: Maxpreps

Public high schools in California
Educational institutions established in 1911
Schools in Amador County, California
1911 establishments in California